The Sustainable Energy Coalition (SEC) is a political advocacy group that seeks to influence federal policies and funding related to energy policy.

History 

The group was founded in 1992, and represents 60 regional and national, environmental, political, consumer, business and energy policy organizations.

Goals 
The Coalition advocates increased federal support for energy efficiency and renewable energy technologies.  They also recommend reducing federal support for non-sustainable energy resources (by virtue of their polluting qualities, or safety issues involved in their extraction or waste generation).

Membership 

Membership includes advocates of renewable fuels, hydrogen, methanol, ethanol, and other biofuels. Also included in membership are companies selling products including energy conservation devices and controls.
A few of the coalition member organizations are:
American Wind Energy Association
Austin Energy. a utility promoting wind power
Bullitt Foundation
Environmental and Energy Study Institute
Geothermal Energy Association
GE Wind Energy
Global Green USA
Greenpeace USA
National Hydrogen Association
National Hydropower Association
Nuclear Information & Resource Service
Ocean Renewable Energy Coalition, an advocate for wave farm technology
Public Citizen
Sacramento Municipal Utility District
Union of Concerned Scientists

See also 
Alliance to Save Energy - a group with similar energy conservation goals

References

External links 

 Official website

Lobbying organizations based in Washington, D.C.
Energy policy of the United States
1992 establishments in Washington, D.C.